James Albert McKenzie (4 October 1867 – 19 August 1939) was an Australian politician.

He was born in Hobart. In 1927 he was elected to the Tasmanian Legislative Council as an independent member for Hobart. He served until he was defeated in 1933.

References

1867 births
1939 deaths
Independent members of the Parliament of Tasmania
Members of the Tasmanian Legislative Council